Menegazzia jamesii is a species of lichen found in Australia.

See also
List of Menegazzia species

References

jamesii
Lichen species
Lichens described in 2004
Taxa named by Gintaras Kantvilas
Lichens of Australia